Eva Magni (July 28, 1909 – February 11, 2005) was an Italian stage   and film actress. She was active between 1926 and the late 1970s.

Biography
Magni was born in Milan into a family of artists, and made her professional debut in 1926, in the stage company Teatro d'Arte di Roma directed by Luigi Pirandello. She debuted as lead actress two years later, in the company directed by Dario Niccodemi. After working in the stage companies led by Memo Benassi,  Maria Melato and Laura Carli, in 1940 she was appointed first actress in the Renzo Ricci's company, with whom she eventually started a sentimental relationship. She married Ricci in December 1960 after the death of his first wife, Margherita Bagni.

Magni's first film appearance was as Lida Bonelli in Paprika (1933), directed by Carl Boese and starring Vittorio De Sica. She was in six more films during the 1930s. Her eighth and last film was in 1963 as the widow Nanni in Il maestro di Vigevano  (The Teacher from Vigevano), directed by Elio Petri, and starring Alberto Sordi and Claire Bloom.

Magni was also active on radio.

Magni retired from acting after Ricci’s death in 1978. In the 1990s she was often a guest in the Canale 5 late night talk show Maurizio Costanzo Show. She died in her home in Milan in 2005.

Filmography
 Paprika (1933) - Lida Bonelli
 The Girl with the Bruise (1933)
 Il presidente della Ba.Ce.Cre.Mi. (1933)
 La canzone del sole (The Song of the Sun, 1934) - Signora Bardelli
 Il serpente a sonagli (1935) – Diomira
 Golden Arrow (1935) - Maria 
 The Amnesiac (1936) (uncredited)
 Il maestro di Vigevano  (The Teacher from Vigevano, 1963) - Nanini’s widow

Theatre (partial list)
 Long Day's Journey into Night

References

Further reading

External links

1909 births
2005 deaths
Actresses from Milan
20th-century Italian actresses